Dylan Groenewald (born 29 June 1995) is a South African professional squash player. He achieved his highest career PSA singles ranking of 301 in January 2020.

References

External links 
Profile at PSA
 

1995 births
Living people
South African male squash players
People from Krugersdorp
Sportspeople from Gauteng
21st-century South African people